The 2020–21 season was the Chittagong Abahani's 41st season since its establishment in 1980 and their 11th season in the Bangladesh Premier League. This also remarked their 7th consecutive season in the top flight after getting promoted in 2014. In addition to domestic league, Ctg Abahani participated on this season's edition of Federation Cup. The season covered the period from December 2020 to September 2021, with the late ending to the season due to the COVID-19 pandemic in Bangladesh.

On 16 March 2020, All sorts of sports activities in Bangladesh were postponed until March 31 as a precaution to combat the spread of coronavirus in the country, according to a press release issued by the Ministry of Youth and Sports. So beginning of this season was delayed.

Season review

Pre-season 
Before starting the season, Chittagong Abahani decided to renew the contract of head coach Maruful Haque.

Team management was planning to bring some changes in local player collection & retain foreign players. Nigerian forward Matthew Chinedu left the club in August to join cypriot club Ypsonas FC. Uzbek defender Shukurali Pulatov also joined Uzbek club FC Turon in September. However, they both rejoined Ctg Abahani in December.  

The official announcements of contracts, signings and camp scheduling was delayed as the vice-president & football committee chairman of the club, Tarafder Ruhul Amin, was sick till early November. 

In November, it was announced that veteran goalkeeper Mazharul Islam Himel has signed for Ctg Abahani, replacing Mohammad Nehal as team management didn’t renewed the contract with Nehal.

Players
Chittagong Abahani Ltd. squad for 2020–21 season.

Transfers

In

Out

Loans out

Pre-season and friendlies
No pre-season and friendly match has been played.

Competition

Overview

Federation Cup

Group stage

Group C

Knockout phase

Premier League

League table

Results summary

Results by round

Matches

Statistics

Squad statistics

Goalscorers

Assists

References

Sport in Chittagong
Bangladeshi football club records and statistics
2020 in Bangladeshi football
2021 in Bangladeshi football